The Municipality of Polzela is a municipality in the traditional region of Styria in northeastern Slovenia. The seat of the municipality is the town of Polzela. Polzela became a municipality in 1998.

Settlements

In addition to the municipal seat of Polzela, the municipality also includes the following settlements:

 Andraž nad Polzelo
 Breg pri Polzeli
 Dobrič
 Ločica ob Savinji
 Orova Vas
 Podvin pri Polzeli
 Založe

References

External links

Municipality of Polzela on Geopedia
Municipality of Polzela website

Polzela
1998 establishments in Slovenia